Abi al Ashar is a Libyan football club based in Tajura, Tripoli which plays in the Libyan Premier League.

Football clubs in Libya
1986 in Libya
Association football clubs established in 1986